Diosdado P. Banatao (born May 23, 1946) is a Filipino entrepreneur and engineer working in the high-tech industry, credited with having developed the first 10-Mbit Ethernet CMOS with silicon coupler data-link control and transceiver chip, the first system logic chip set for IBM's PC-XT and the PC-AT, and the local bus concept and the first Windows Graphics accelerator chip for personal computers.  A three-time start-up veteran, he co-founded Mostron, Chips and Technologies, and S3 Graphics. His father, Salvador Banatao, was a rice farmer. His mother, Rosita Banatao, was a housekeeper.

Banatao is known for his rags to riches story. During his childhood, he walked barefoot on a dirt road just to reach Malabbac Elementary School. He pursued his secondary education at the Jesuit-run Ateneo de Tuguegarao. After high school, he pursued his Bachelor of Science in Electric Engineering from the Mapúa Institute of Technology and graduated cum laude.

After college, he turned down several job offers, including one from Meralco. He joined Philippine Airlines as a trainee pilot, and later joined Boeing. At Boeing, he worked as a design engineer for the company's new commercial airliner and cargo transport aircraft, Boeing 747, in the United States. With the opportunity to stay in the United States, he then took his Master of Science in Electrical Engineering and Computer Science at Stanford University and finished in 1972. Banatao also joined the Homebrew Computer Club, where he met Steve Jobs and Steve Wozniak.

After finishing his master's degree, Banatao worked with different technology companies such as the National Semiconductor, Intersil, and Commodore International where he designed the first single chip, 16-bit microprocessor-based calculator. In 1981, he developed the first 10-Mbit Ethernet CMOS with silicon coupler data-link control and transceiver chip while working in Seeq Technology. He was also credited for the first system logic chip set for IBM's PC-XT and the PC-AT; the local bus concept and the first Windows Graphics accelerator chip for personal computers.

Career

Business
In 1984, Banatao and his business partner Francis Siu, founded a high-technology company, Moston, starting with a capital of half a million US dollars. Mostron was launched as a manufacturer of motherboards. They also hired Ron Yara of Intel as a company executive. After he developed a five-chip set, he co-founded Chips and Technologies in 1985. The company developed system logic chip set for IBM's PC-XT and the PC-AT.  The company earned $12 million in its first four months. After 22 months, the company went public. In 1989, Banatao launched his third start-up company, S3 Graphics, with Yara in Santa Clara, California. S3 focused on enhancing the graphic capabilities in personal computers by using a graphic accelerator chip. The key to this was Banatao's invention of a local bus. The company had an initial public offering of $30 million. In 1996, the company became the leader of the graphic-chips market, beating a strong competitor, Cirrus Logic, Inc. In the same year, Chips & Technologies was sold to Intel for about $300 million. In 2000, he decided to start-up his own venture capital firm named Tallwood Venture Capital with a capital of US$300 million, all of which came from his own pocket. He later sold another company for more than $1 billion, where it had less than 20 employees. Dado was also part of SiRF, where it started the consumerization of GPS after it had been declassified by the US Government.

In 2010, Banatao became Ikanos Communications' CEO after Michael Gulett resigned as the company's CEO and President.

Philanthropy
In the Philippines, Banatao through his Dado Banatao Educational Foundation, annually awards five educational scholarships to intelligent Filipino students who have bright futures in the field of engineering and technology. Also, with Philippine Development Foundation which he chairs, he is helping send brilliant young Filipinos to school to help them reach their full potential. PhilDev was spun off from Ayala Foundation's program.
 Through his Banatao Filipino American Fund, he assists Californian high school students of Filipino heritage who are pursuing a college education in engineering. He also built a computer center at his grade school in his childhood town of Iguig in Cagayan Valley, making it the only public school with the most modern computer network in the Philippines.

Recognition

References

1946 births
20th-century Filipino businesspeople
21st-century Filipino businesspeople
Filipino emigrants to the United States
Filipino inventors
Living people
Mapúa University alumni
People from Cagayan
Stanford University School of Engineering alumni